
Gmina Małogoszcz is an urban-rural gmina (administrative district) in Jędrzejów County, Świętokrzyskie Voivodeship, in south-central Poland.

The gmina contains part of the protected area called Chęciny-Kielce Landscape Park.

Villages
Apart from the town of Małogoszcz, Gmina Małogoszcz contains the villages and settlements of Bocheniec, Henryków, Karsznice, Kozłów, Lasochów, Leśnica, Lipnica, Ludwinów, Mieronice, Mniszek, Rembieszyce, Wiśnicz, Wola Tesserowa, Wrzosówka, Wygnanów, Zakrucze, Żarczyce Duże, Żarczyce Małe and Złotniki.

Neighbouring gminas
Gmina Małogoszcz is bordered by the gminas of Chęciny, Jędrzejów, Krasocin, Łopuszno, Oksa, Piekoszów, Sobków and Włoszczowa.

References
 Polish official population figures 2006

Malogoszcz
Jędrzejów County